The 2011–12 Australian Figure Skating Championships was held in Brisbane from 2 through 10 December 2011. Skaters competed in the disciplines of men's singles, ladies' singles, pair skating, ice dancing, and synchronized skating across many levels, including senior, junior, novice, Intermediate, and primary divisions.

Senior results

Men

Ladies

Ice dancing

Synchronized

Junior results

Men

Ladies

Pairs

Ice dancing

Synchronized

Novice results

Boys

Girls

16 total competitors.

Pairs

Synchronized

External links
 2011–12 Australian Figure Skating Championships results

2011
2011 in figure skating
2012 in figure skating
Figure Skating Championships 2011
Figure Skating Championships 2011